Vineh or Vinah may refer to:

Vineh of Bulgaria, Bulgarian king
Vineh Peak, mountain in the South Shetland Islands
Vineh, Alborz, a village in Alborz Province, Iran
Vinah, Kermanshah, a village in Kermanshah Province, Iran